IPA numbers are a legacy system of coding the symbols of the International Phonetic Alphabet. They were the organizational basis for XSAMPA and the IPA Extensions block of Unicode.

Following the Kiel Convention in 1989, most letters, diacritics and other symbols of the IPA were assigned a 3-digit numerical code, with updates through 2005. The system never saw much if any use and is now defunct, having been superseded by Unicode.  

The semantic and graphic categories of the symbols are assigned different ranges of numbers:
The 100 series are IPA consonants, the 200s retired and non-IPA consonants, the 300s vowels, the 400s diacritics, the 500s suprasegmentals, the 600s extIPA, the 700s capital letters and the 900s delimiters. Some symbols have more than one code.

100: IPA consonants
Current IPA consonants, and those retired after the Kiel convention, are assigned numbers in the 100 range. The tie-bars used to create affricate consonants are assigned numbers in the 400 and 500 ranges.

200: retired and non-IPA consonants
The 200 range is mostly retired IPA consonants, though it includes several letters of the Americanist Phonetic Alphabet that are sometimes used alongside the IPA. A few superscript IPA letters, including a single vowel, have also been assigned numbers in this range. Symbols official until retirement by Kiel in 1989 are numbered upwards from 201; those already retired, or not IPA at all, are numbered downwards from 299.

In addition, there is the pre-composed character , the loop-tail  (see the main consonant chart above), and the implicit IPA letter .

300: IPA vowels
Vowel letters that were official after Kiel were numbered upward from 301. , which was once needed to create  with a diacritic, two letters retired at Kiel, and the three non-rhotic vowels added in the 1993 and 1996 updates to the IPA, were numbered downward from 399.

400: non-tone diacritics

500: suprasegmentals
Indicators of tone, stress, intonation and other elements of prosody. Combinations of tone diacritics or letters that were illustrated on the IPA Chart in 1999 are assigned individual numbers, leaving 3 tone diacritics and many, many compound tone letters without assigned numbers.

600: extIPA
The symbols of the Extensions to the IPA were numbered sequentially to 683. Several are redundant with other ranges. (The capital Latin letters are not shown here; see the 700 range.) The symbols added in the 2015 expansion of extIPA were apparently never assigned numbers either. 

Number 611 is the 'balloon' used to encircle unidentified segments.

700: capital letters
The capitals of the basic Latin alphabet, A–Z, are assigned the numbers 701 to 726 in order. 

C 703, F 706, J 710, L 712, V 722 and W 723 are redundant with their extIPA numbers 624, 622, 626, 625, 621, 623, respectively.

900: transcription delimiters
Brackets and other punctuation that mark linguistic transcription

References

External links
IPA number chart A chart of the numbers of most of the current symbols in the IPA proper, on the IPA website

International Phonetic Alphabet